IGCE may refer to:
Indo Global College of Engineering
Independent Government Cost Estimate